LAHS or Lahs may refer to:

Schools
Lake Arthur High School
Leavitt Area High School
Little Angels High School, Srinagar
Los Alamitos High School
Los Alamos High School
Los Altos High School (Hacienda Heights, California)
Los Altos High School (Los Altos, California)
Los Angeles High School

Other uses
Lahs (album), 2019 album by Allah-Las
Curt Lahs (1893–1958), German painter and arts professor